A Tango for You is a 1930 German musical film directed by Géza von Bolváry and starring Willi Forst, Fee Malten, and Paul Otto.

The film's sets were designed by the art director Robert Neppach.

Cast

References

Bibliography

External links 
 

1930 films
Films of the Weimar Republic
German musical comedy films
1930 musical comedy films
1930s German-language films
Films directed by Géza von Bolváry
Films about singers
German black-and-white films
1930s German films